The 2015–16 NCAA Division II men's ice hockey season began on October 23, 2015 and concluded on February 27 of the following year. This was the 34th season of second-tier college ice hockey.

Regular season

Standings

See also
 2015–16 NCAA Division I men's ice hockey season
 2015–16 NCAA Division III men's ice hockey season

References

External links

 
NCAA